Windsor-Clive is a surname. Notable people with the surname include:

Ivor Windsor-Clive, 2nd Earl of Plymouth PC (1889–1943), English nobleman and Conservative politician
Robert Windsor-Clive, 1st Earl of Plymouth GBE CB PC (1857–1923), British nobleman and Conservative politician known as The Lord Windsor from 1869 to 1905
George Windsor-Clive (politician, born 1835) (1835–1918), British Conservative Party politician
George Windsor-Clive (politician, born 1878) (1878–1968), Conservative Party politician elected as the Member of Parliament for Ludlow between 1923 and 1945
Other Windsor-Clive, 3rd Earl of Plymouth (1923–2018), British peer
Robert Windsor-Clive (MP) (1824–1859), British Conservative Party politician

Compound surnames
English-language surnames
Surnames of English origin